Death on the Road is a live album and video released by British heavy metal band Iron Maiden on 29 August 2005 on CD and vinyl, and on 6 February 2006 on DVD. The album was recorded at Westfalenhallen in Dortmund, Germany on 24 November 2003, during the Dance of Death World Tour.

The release performed well in the national charts of several countries; Finland (no. 5), Sweden (no. 7), Norway (no. 12), France (no. 14), Italy (no. 17), Switzerland (no. 17), Spain (no. 18), United Kingdom (no. 22), Ireland (no. 27), the Netherlands (no. 39) and India (no.29).

Background
The video was released in a 3 DVD set, with the first two representing the concert footage in 5.1 Digital audio and stereo and the final containing special features, including a documentary and the promo videos for "Wildest Dreams" and "Rainmaker".

The 70-minute documentary, directed by Matthew Amos, shows the recording of the Dance of Death album at Sarm West Studios, London and the subsequent preparations for the following tour, including interviews with the majority of the band's road crew. Additional and extended interviews with crew and fans (recorded at Earls Court, London) were also included as individual films, entitled "Life on the Road" and "The Fans". The documentary contains the first ever released footage of the band in the recording studio.

Following the original 2006 DVD release, the band noted that several fans had complained about playback issues with the stereo disc, and stated that they would investigate the issue. A week later, the US release date for the DVD was postponed from 21 February 2006 to 30 January 2007, due to "unforeseen production issues".

The cover was designed by Melvyn Grant.

The version of "Fear of the Dark" on this release was later included in the Edward the Great 2005 re-release.

Reception

Reviews for the album were generally positive, with Kerrang! deeming it "very nearly the ultimate Iron Maiden live album," commenting that the release proves that the band "are as exciting, relevant and unique in 2005 as they were two decades ago." AllMusic, however, were more critical of the album, remarking that "longtime fans do not need any more live versions of "Number of the Beast," "Hallowed Be Thy Name," "Run to the Hills," or "The Trooper,"" although also stating that the band lays "waste [to] any notions that they can't hold themselves to the performance standards of their younger days." Guy Strachan praised the band for "capturing...the raw aggression of the band's delivery" but also suggested that "while it does do a very good job at capturing a good Maiden show for posterity, by default it contains six songs that have not been issued in a live context before but many of the other ten have featured on damn near every other live album.  As a souvenir of a specific gig/tour it works very well, but in the grander scheme of things can be passed over for an album that has a greater tracklist variance".

The DVD release was met with critical acclaim, receiving full marks from Kerrang! who deemed it "the next best thing to having front row seats at a Maiden show." Record Collector were just as positive, calling the package "a visua-sonic treat." Although criticising the "blink-and-you'll-miss-it editing," Guitarist also awarded it 5 out of 5, stating, "It may seem strange to you that Maiden are bigger than ever these days, but if you're in any doubt as to why, the evidence is right here." Classic Rock praised the video for being more intimate than 2002's Rock in Rio, commenting that "it provides irrefutable proof that Iron Maiden are still the world's greatest living heavy metal band — bar none." Q were somewhat less positive, giving the DVD a lower score of 4 out of 5, but still called it "a lavish tribute to one of the UK's most enduring bands."

Track listing

DVD special features
 Death on the Road documentary
 "Life on the Road" documentary
 "The Fans" (interviews)
 Dance of Death EPK
 "Wildest Dreams" and "Rainmaker" promo videos
 Photo and artwork galleries

Personnel
Production and performance credits are adapted from the album liner notes.
Iron Maiden
Bruce Dickinson – vocals
Dave Murray – guitars
Janick Gers – guitars
Adrian Smith – guitars, backing vocals
Steve Harris – bass, backing vocals
Nicko McBrain – drums
Additional musician
Michael Kenney – keyboards
Production
Kevin Shirley – producer, engineer, mixing
Steve Harris – co-producer, video editor, executive producer (documentary)
Drew Griffiths – assistant engineer
Howie Weinberg – stereo mastering
Dave Kutch – 5.1 audio mastering
Tomas Coox – additional audio mastering
Johnny Burke – editing technician (concert)
Matthew Amos – director (documentary)
Tessa Watts – producer (documentary)
Joe Abercrombie – editor (documentary)
MJ Morgan – line producer (documentary)
Howard Johnson – interviewer (documentary)
Valerie Potter – interviewer (documentary)
Melvyn Grant – sleeve illustration
Peacock – sleeve design, sleeve concept
Ross Halfin – photography
Simon Fowler – photography
Rod Smallwood – management, executive producer (documentary)
Andy Taylor – management
Merck Mercuriadis – management

Charts

Album

Video

Certifications
Album

Video

Notes

Iron Maiden video albums
Albums produced by Kevin Shirley
Iron Maiden live albums
2005 video albums
2005 live albums
Live video albums
EMI Records live albums
EMI Records video albums
Live heavy metal albums